Khumukcham Sanjita Chanu (born 2 January 1994) is an Indian weightlifter. Born in Kakching Khunou, Kakching district, Manipur, she is a two time Commonwealth Games Champion. Chanu won the gold medals at the 2014 Glasgow and the 2018 Gold Coast events in the women's 48 kg and 53 kg weight category respectively. She holds the Commonwealth Games record of 84 kg for the Snatch segment in the latter weight category.

Background
She was born to a Hindu Meitei family.
Sanjita took up the sport weightlifting in 2006 in Manipur. She considers pioneering weightlifter and fellow Manipuri, Kunjarani Devi, her hero.

Career

2014 
Khumukcham Sanjita Chanu won a gold in women's 48kg weightlifting at the 2014 Commonwealth Games; it was India's first medal on the second day of the competition. She started with an attempt at 72 kg and later lifted 77 kg, not dropping any weight in snatch. Chanu took an unassailable lead with a 96 kg lift in the clean and jerk event to secure the gold medal with a total weight of 173 kg. Chanu's total of 173 kg missed the Games record (held by the 2010 Commonwealth Games gold medal winner Augustina Nkem Nwaokolo) by two kilograms. However, her 77 kg lift in the snatch segment equalled Nwaokolo's Commonwealth Games record.

2018 
Chanu won her second successive gold medal at the Commonwealth Games in the 2018 edition held in Gold Coast, Australia. She had moved to a higher weight category of 53 kg and secured the title with a total lift of 192 kg, 10 kg more than second-placed Dika Toua. En route to her gold medal, she bettered her performance from 2014 Commonwealth Games and broke the Games record for the snatch category with a lift of 84 kg; she lifted a weight of 108 kg in the clean and jerk segment.

On 30 May, Chanu was provisionally suspended by the IWF after testing positive for testosterone.
In 2020 she was cleared after the charge was dropped.

References

External links 

Commonwealth Games gold medallists for India
Living people
1994 births
Indian female weightlifters
Sportswomen from Manipur
Weightlifters at the 2014 Commonwealth Games
Weightlifters at the 2014 Asian Games
Commonwealth Games medallists in weightlifting
21st-century Indian women
21st-century Indian people
Weightlifters from Manipur
Weightlifters at the 2018 Commonwealth Games
Asian Games competitors for India
Medallists at the 2014 Commonwealth Games
Medallists at the 2018 Commonwealth Games